Unión Club Deportivo Burladés is a Spanish football team based in Burlada, in the autonomous community of Navarre. Founded in 1964 as Club Burladés, the club changed to its current name in 1984, and it plays in Tercera División – Group 15, holding home matches at Estadio Ripagaina.

History 
Football had been played in Burlada even before the 1920s. In 1923 a group of enthusiasts founded the club, named Athletic Burladés. 

In the 2017-18 season the club finished 3rd in the Tercera División, Group 15.

Season to season

35 seasons in Tercera División

References

External links
 
ArefePedia team profile 
La Preferente team profile 
Soccerway team profile

Football clubs in Navarre
Association football clubs established in 1964
1964 establishments in Spain